Gathanga is a settlement in Kenya's Kiambu County.

References 

Populated places in Nairobi Province